The Breda Ba.32 was an Italian airliner prototype designed and built by the Breda company.

Design and development
The Breda Ba.32 was a low-wing trimotor monoplane with fixed, spatted main landing gear. It was powered by three Pratt & Whitney R-985 Wasp Junior nine-cylinder air-cooled radial engines. It had a crew of two, and its cabin could accommodate up to 10 passengers.

The Ba.32 prototype first flew in 1931, but despite displaying good flight characteristics, no production orders ensued and no further examples were built.

Operators

Specifications (Ba.32)

See also

Notes

Ba.032
1930s Italian airliners
Low-wing aircraft
Trimotors
Aircraft first flown in 1931